Beta Ethniki 1999–2000 complete season.

League table

Results

Promotion play-off

|}

Relegation play-off

|}

Top scorers

References

External links
RSSSF.org

Second level Greek football league seasons
Greece
2